Triakel is the first album by the Swedish folk band of the same name, Triakel. It was released in 1998 on Xource records, a division of MNW Records Group AB.

Reception

AllMusic's reviewer compared the band's performance to English folk artists like Shirley and Dolly Collins noting a mix of "gentleness and fury".

Track listing
"Lilla Hin/Gammel Sara (Old Sara)" – 4:10
"I himmelen (In Paradise)" – 4:02
"I fjol (Last Year)" – 1:53
"Tusen tankar (A Thousand Thoughts)" – 6:43
"Mjölnarens måg (The Miller’s Son-in-law)" – 2:33
"Oväntad bröllopsgäst (The Unexpected Wedding-guest)" – 3:57
"Om dagen står du städs för mig (All Day Long You’re On My Mind)" – 2:52
"Alla gossar (All the Young Men)" – 3:12
"Födelsedagsfesten (The Birthday Party)" – 3:19
"Lapp-Nils polska" – 2:08
"Lejonbruden (The Lion and the Bride)" – 3:17
"En vacker vän (A Fair Young Love)" – 4:44

Personnel 
 Emma Härdelin - vocals
 Kjell-Erik Eriksson - fiddle
 Janne Strömstedt - harmonium
 Triakel - song arrangements
 Gustav Hylén - producer
 Bernhard Löhr - CD mastering
 Lennart Jonasson - photographs
 Pelle Anderson - graphics design

References

1998 albums
Triakel albums